Ampelopsis glandulosa is a species of plant native to China, Japan, India, Nepal, Myanmar, Vietnam, and the Philippines.

Varieties
Several varieties are distinguished:
	 	 
 var. hancei
 var. kulingensis
 var. glandulosa
 var. 
 var. brevipedunculata

Cultivation

Ampelopsis glandulosa is used as an ornamental plant in gardens.

References

glandulosa